The tamarugo conebill (Conirostrum tamarugense) is a species of bird in the family Thraupidae.
It breeds in northern Chile and is a vagrant to southern Peru, and receives its name from the tamarugo, a type of shrub to which is closely associated.

Its natural habitats are subtropical or tropical moist montane forests, subtropical or tropical dry shrubland, subtropical or tropical high-altitude shrubland, and plantations.
It is threatened by habitat loss.

References

External links
BirdLife Species Factsheet.

tamarugo conebill
Birds of Chile
tamarugo conebill
Taxonomy articles created by Polbot